is a river in Hokkaidō, Japan.

The Saru River rises in the Hidaka Mountains and empties into the Pacific. It is considered sacred in traditional Ainu beliefs.

The Nibutani Dam is situated on the Saru River, at Nibutani village. The construction of this dam was the subject of famous domestic litigation, producing the first ever Japanese legal decision to recognise the Ainu people as an indigenous people. Construction of a second dam, the Biratori Dam is also planned by the Hokkaido Development Board. The 'Cultural Landscape along the Saru River resulting from Ainu Tradition and Modern Settlement' has been designated an Important Cultural Landscape.

See also
 Cultural Landscapes of Japan

References

Rivers of Hokkaido
Rivers of Japan
Biratori, Hokkaido